Periyar Maniammai Institute of Science & Technology (PMIST), formerly Periyar Maniammai College of Technology for Women and Periyar Maniammai University (PMU), is a private deemed-to-be-university headquarters is in the town of Vallam in Thanjavur, Tamil Nadu, India.

History 
PMIST was established in 1998 as Periyar Maniammai College of Technology for Women, named after social reformers Periyar and his wife Annai E. V. R. Maniammai. The college was originally affiliated to Bharathidasan University until 2001, when it was reassigned to Anna University. In 2007 it was awarded the deemed-to-be-university status and renamed as Periyar Maniammai University. In 2010, it was one of 44 institutions which were due to lose the deem university status, which resulted in student protest and violence. The decision was halted by the Supreme Court and the issue was left undecided until 2014. In 2017, following the University Grants Commission directive to 123 institutes not to use "university" in the title of deemed universities, it was renamed Periyar Maniammai Institute of Science & Technology.

Faculty and departments
 Faculty of Architecture and Planning (FAP)
 Department of Architecture
 Faculty of Engineering and Technology (FET)
Department of Aerospace Engineering
Department of Biotechnology
Department of Civil Engineering
Department of Electronics and Communication Engineering
Department of Electrical and Electronics Engineering
Department of Mechanical Engineering
 Faculty of Computing Sciences and Engineering (FCSE)
Department of Computer Science and Engineering
Department of Information Technology
Department of Computer Science and Applications
Department of Software Engineering
Faculty of Humanities, Science and Management (FHSM)
Commerce
Chemistry
English
Mathematics
Physics
Management Studies
Education
Physical Education

References

External links
 Official website

Education in Thanjavur district
Universities in Tamil Nadu
1988 establishments in Tamil Nadu
Educational institutions established in 1988